Nusret (Eng. 'the help of God') was a naval ship of the Ottoman Navy, which served as a minelayer during the Gallipoli Campaign, and later fulfilled various roles in the Turkish Navy; as minelayer (1927–1937), diver vessel (1937–1939) and tender (1939–1955). She was laid down in 1911 and launched from Schiff & Maschinenbau AG 'Germania' at Kiel, Germany on 4 December of that year.

Characteristics
Nusret was 40.2 meters long and displaced 365 tons. Her beam was 7.57 meters and her draught was 3.4 meters. Her propulsion was two vertical triple expansion steam engines powered by two Schultz boilers, driving twin screws. This system was designed to propel her at 15 knots, but when she arrived at Istanbul in 1913 she could only make 13 knots. She was designed on the basis of a tugboat, but with mine rails for forty mines on the stern instead of bollards and winches. A crane was mounted on the back end of her superstructure, aft of the funnel, to assist in loading the mines. Aside from the mines, her armament consisted of two 47mm SK L/45 C/99 quick-firing guns mounted on platforms on either side of the bridge, manufactured by Krupp in Germany. In 1927 these guns were replaced by 57mm variants of the same weapon; also in 1927 her mine rails were extended to hold twenty extra mines.

Service history
Nusret was commissioned into the Ottoman Navy in 1913, captained by Lieutenant Tophaneli Hakki (Güverte Kıdemli Yüzbaşı Tophaneli İbrahim oğlu Hakkı) under the command of Lieutenant-Colonel Geehl. Nusret played a pivotal role in the Dardanelles Campaign, laying 26 mines in an unexpected position in February 1915 just prior to the ill-fated invasion which sank ,  and the French battleship , and left the British battlecruiser  badly damaged.

After World War I Nusret was laid up in Istanbul until 1926/7 when she was refitted at Gölcük.  In 1937 she became the diving vessel Yardin and in 1939 reverted to Nusret as a tender.  In 1955 she was decommissioned and again laid up, with the intention to convert her to a museum ship.  However, in 1962 she was sold to commercial buyers who had her converted to a cargo motorship, unrecognisable as the former minelayer, entering service as Kaptan Nusret in 1966.  In April 1989 she sank near Mersin Harbour, and lay submerged for 10 years.

Wreck discovery

In 2002 the wreck of Nusret was acquired by the Municipality of Tarsus, Mersin Province for reconstruction ashore as a museum ship, opened in 2008.

A replica Nusret has been built by the Gölcük Naval Shipyard to be displayed in Çanakkale by the shore of the Narrows of the Dardanelles along with the types of mines that it laid in World War I.  In March 2011 this Nusret was commissioned into the Turkish Navy as the museum ship N-16.

See also
Gonca, the only other surviving Ottoman minelayer from the First World War.

References

Bibliography

External links
 http://www.nusratmayingemisi.com/english/index.php
  https://web.archive.org/web/20070930015351/http://www.canakkale.org/nusrat.shtml

Ships built in Kiel
Minelayers of the Ottoman Navy
Minelayers of the Turkish Navy
Museum ships in Turkey
1911 ships
Museums in Mersin
Gallipoli campaign museum exhibits
World War I naval ships of the Ottoman Empire
Replica ships